Arachnion is a genus of gasteroid fungi in the family Agaricaceae.

Taxonomy
The genus was circumscribed by Lewis David von Schweinitz in 1822 with Arachnion album as the type, and only species. The genus name is Greek for "cobweb".

William Chambers Coker and John Nathaniel Couch circumscribed the family Arachniaceae in 1928 to contain Arachnion. The genus was later placed in the now-defunct family Lycoperdaceae. Modern molecular analysis has shown that Arachnion, as well as other puffball genera, are part of the family Agaricaceae.

Description
Arachnion species have a characteristic gleba, resembling a mass of grainy, sand-like particles. At a microscopic scale, the granules are peridioles, or tiny sacs made of hyphae that contain spores. Inside each sac is a minuscule chamber that contains inward-facing basidia (spore-bearing cells), an arrangement similar to that seen in Lycoperdon. The fruitbodies have a smooth, thin, and fragile peridium that readily disintegrates into small pieces in maturity to expose the granular contents.

Distribution
The genus is widely distributed, with species found in Australia, North and South America, South Africa, and Europe, and Japan.

Species
, Index Fungorum accepts 11 species in Arachnion:
Arachnion alborosellum Verwoerd 1926 – South Africa
Arachnion album Schwein. 1822
Arachnion bovista (Mont.) Mont. 1849
Arachnion firmoderma Verwoerd 1926 – South Africa
Arachnion foetens Speg. 1906 – South America
Arachnion iriemae Rick 1961
Arachnion iulii Quadr. 1996 – Italy
Arachnion lazoi Demoulin 1972
Arachnion lloydianum Demoulin 1972
Arachnion rufum  Lloyd 1906
Arachnion scleroderma Lloyd 1915

See also
List of Agaricaceae genera
List of Agaricales genera

References

Agaricaceae
Agaricales genera
Taxa named by Lewis David de Schweinitz